The 2019–20 Liga IV Arad was the 52nd season of the Liga IV Arad, the fourth tier of the Romanian football league system. The season began on 17 August 2019 and was ended officially on 18 June 2020, due to 2019–20 COVID-19 pandemic. Victoria Zăbrani was crowned as county champion.

Competition format
The 12 teams will play a regular season, followed by a play-off, play-stay and play-out. The regular season is a double round-robin tournament. At the end of the regular season, the first ranked in the play-off group will go to the promotion play-off, the four of the middle group, play-stay, will stay in place, and the last two ranked in the play-out group, will relegated.

Team changes

To Liga IV Arad
Relegated from Liga III
 —

Promoted from Liga V Arad
 Beliu
 Semlecana Semlac

From Liga IV Arad
Promoted to Liga III
 Progresul Pecica

Relegated to Liga V Arad
 Speranța Turnu
 Victoria Nădlac

Other changes
 Cetate Săvârșin and Semlecana Semlac withdrew due to financial problems.

League table

Promotion play-off

Champions of Liga IV – Arad County face champions of Liga IV – Caraș-Severin County and Liga IV – Gorj County.

Region 4 (West)

Group A

See also

Main Leagues
 2019–20 Liga I
 2019–20 Liga II
 2019–20 Liga III
 2019–20 Liga IV

County Leagues (Liga IV series)

 2019–20 Liga IV Alba
 2019–20 Liga IV Argeș
 2019–20 Liga IV Bacău
 2019–20 Liga IV Bihor
 2019–20 Liga IV Bistrița-Năsăud
 2019–20 Liga IV Botoșani
 2019–20 Liga IV Brăila
 2019–20 Liga IV Brașov
 2019–20 Liga IV Bucharest
 2019–20 Liga IV Buzău
 2019–20 Liga IV Călărași
 2019–20 Liga IV Caraș-Severin
 2019–20 Liga IV Cluj
 2019–20 Liga IV Constanța
 2019–20 Liga IV Covasna
 2019–20 Liga IV Dâmbovița
 2019–20 Liga IV Dolj
 2019–20 Liga IV Galați 
 2019–20 Liga IV Giurgiu
 2019–20 Liga IV Gorj
 2019–20 Liga IV Harghita
 2019–20 Liga IV Hunedoara
 2019–20 Liga IV Ialomița
 2019–20 Liga IV Iași
 2019–20 Liga IV Ilfov
 2019–20 Liga IV Maramureș
 2019–20 Liga IV Mehedinți
 2019–20 Liga IV Mureș
 2019–20 Liga IV Neamț
 2019–20 Liga IV Olt
 2019–20 Liga IV Prahova
 2019–20 Liga IV Sălaj
 2019–20 Liga IV Satu Mare
 2019–20 Liga IV Sibiu
 2019–20 Liga IV Suceava
 2019–20 Liga IV Teleorman
 2019–20 Liga IV Timiș
 2019–20 Liga IV Tulcea
 2019–20 Liga IV Vâlcea
 2019–20 Liga IV Vaslui
 2019–20 Liga IV Vrancea

References

External links
 Official website 

 
Sport in Arad County